The following is a list of mayors of the city of Zhytomyr, Ukraine. It includes positions equivalent to mayor, such as chairperson of the city council executive committee.

Mayors 

 Novitsky Florian (Новицький Флоріан), circa 1800
 Ivanov (Іванов), 1814-1815
 Salis (Саліс), 1815-1817
 Gattoni Anthony (Гаттоні Антоній), 1825-1829
 3eidler (3ейдлер), 1829-1829
 Meyer (Мейер), 1829-1830
 Zeidler Michael (Цейдлер Михайло), circa 1838
 Khmelevsky Maxim (Хмелевський Максим), 1844
 Maslovsky Semyon (Масловський Семен), 1844-1845
 Alexey Dontsov (Донцов Олексій), circa 1845
 Kashperovsky Stanislav (Кашперовський Станіслав), circa 1847
 Zeidler Michael (Цейдлер Михайло), 1847-1862
 Mykola Dorozhynsky (Дорожинський Микола), circa 1849
 Hramchenko Panas (Храмченко Панас), 1862-1865
 Maslovsky Julian (Масловський Юліан), 1865-1867
 Vorontsov Mikhail (Воронцов Михайло), 1867-1876
 Lyashkov Kyprian (Ляшков Кипріян), 1876-1883
 Trull Oscar Ernestovich (Трулль Оскар Ернестович), 1883-1886
 Zholtkevich Ivan Mikhailovich (Жолткевич Іван Михайлович), 1886-1893
 Alexander Petrovich (Старосвітський Олександр Петрович), 1895-1897
 Davydovsky Alexander Dmitrievich (Давидовський Олександр Дмитрович), 1898-1908
 Domanevsky Ivan Oskarovich (Доманевський Іван Оскарович), 1909-1915
 Pivotsky Anton Frantsovych (Півоцький Антон Францович), 1917-1919
 Voronitsyn Ivan Petrovich (Вороніцин Іван Петрович), 1919-1920
 Табаков, 1924-1926
 Sumtsov MM (Сумцов М.М.), 1926-1927
  (Бега Федот Федотович), 1927-1928
 Говор, 1928-1929
 Yurchenko Yakiv Hryhorovych (Юрченко Яків Григорович), 1929-1930
 Dvorak Karl Matviyovych (Дворжак Карл Матвійович), 1930-1931
 Korobkin Fedor Timofeevich (Коробкін Федір Тимофійович), 1931-1933
 Bochok Mykhailo Tymofiiovych (Бочок Михайло Тимофійович), 1933
 Weisbein N. (Вейсбейн Н.), 1933-1934
  (Кузнецов Яків Петрович), 1934-1936
 Hasin (Хасін), 1936-1937
 Ачкасов, 1937-1938
  (Діденко Максим Авксентійович), 1938
  (Рожанчук Микола Михайлович), 1938-1939
 Mykhailo Hrechukha, 1938-1939
 Shornikov (Шорніков), 1939
  (Сиромятников Михайло Олексійович), 1939-1941
 Rye Vladimir Mikhailovich (Житній Володимир Михайлович), 1939-1941
  (Орищенко Юрій Андрійович), 1941
 Pavlovsky Dmitry Alekseevich (Павловський Дмитро Олексійович), 1941-1943
  (Співак Мойсей Семенович), 1944-1949
 Voinenko Mikhail Dmitrovich (Войненко Михайло Дмитрович), 1944
 Sokolov Anton Nikolaevich (Соколов Антон Миколайович), 1944-1946
 Kustikov (Кустіков), 1946-1947
 Moroz Kyrylo Matviyovych (Мороз Кирило Матвійович), 1947-1948
 Lavrenov Andrey Alekseevich (Лавреньов Андрій Олексійович), 1949-1950
  (Костюченко Сергій Пилипович), 1949-1950
 Bilyk Kyrylo Leontiyovych (Білик Кирило Леонтійович), 1950-1951
 Botnariov Andrey Mikhailovich (Ботнарьов Андрій Михайлович), 1950-1952
 Prilipko IA (Прилипко І.А.), 1951-1952
  (Удовицький Василь Семенович), 1952-1956
 Volkov Hryhoriy Yosypovych (Волков Григорій Йосипович), 1952-1953
  (Гриша Олександр Іванович), 1953-1956
 Janulis Victor Kazimirovich (Януліс Віктор Казимирович), 1956-1969
  (Казьмерчук Лаврентій Аврамович), 1956-1958
  (Гаркавенко Георгій Павлович), 1958-1963
 Lebedev Mykola Yukhymovich (Лебедєв Микола Юхимович), 1963-1969
 Tkachuk Yaroslav Fedorovich (Ткачук Ярослав Федорович), 1969-1978
  (Острожинський Валентин Євгенович), 1969-1973
  (Яковенко Микола Микитович), 1973-1987
  (Коструба Іван Федорович), 1978-1986
  (Хомчук Леонід Михайлович), 1986-1990
 Gudyuk Vladimir Frantsovich (Гудюк Володимир Францович), 1987-1990
  (Журба Микола Григорович), 1990-1991
  (Мельничук Віталій Григорович), 1990-1992
 Fesenko Anatoly Ivanovich (Фесенко Анатолій Іванович), 1992-2002
  (Буравков Георгій Анатолійович), 2002-2006
  (Шелудченко Віра Тимофіївна), 2006-2010 
  (Дебой Володимир Михайлович), 2010-2015 
  (Сухомлин Сергій Іванович), 2015-

See also
 Zhytomyr history
 History of Zhytomyr (in Ukrainian)

References

This article incorporates information from the Polish Wikipedia and Ukrainian Wikipedia.

History of Zhytomyr Oblast
Zhytomyr